Wang Tianqing (born 1 April 2001) is a Chinese footballer currently playing as a defender for Guangzhou.

Career statistics

Club
.

References

2001 births
Living people
Chinese footballers
Association football defenders
Guangzhou F.C. players